The Golden Spikes Award is bestowed annually to the best amateur baseball player in the United States. The award, created by USA Baseball and sponsored by the Major League Baseball Players Association, was first presented in 1978. It is given to an amateur player who best exhibits and combines "exceptional on-field ability and exemplary sportsmanship". The award is considered the most prestigious in amateur baseball.

Ten winners of the Golden Spikes Award are members of the National College Baseball Hall of Fame, including Bob Horner, the inaugural winner in 1978. In that same year, he was the first overall MLB draft pick and proceeded to win the Rookie of the Year Award. Seven Golden Spikes Award winners went on to become the first overall MLB draft pick. Only Horner achieved the MLB Rookie of the Year Award in the same year (although Jason Jennings and Buster Posey were voted the top rookies of the National League several years after winning the Golden Spikes Award). Jim Abbott, Jered Weaver and Tim Lincecum are the only award winners to pitch an MLB no-hitter, while Horner is the only one to hit four home runs in one MLB game. Furthermore, 17 players won the Dick Howser Trophy (considered to be the Heisman Trophy of college baseball) alongside the Golden Spikes Award.  No player has won the award more than once, and no Golden Spikes recipient has yet been inducted into the National Baseball Hall of Fame.

The winner has been announced annually during a live broadcast of ESPN's SportsCenter since 2014. Immediately following the announcement, the award winner and the other finalists are honored at a banquet in Los Angeles.  The most recent recipient of the award is Ivan Melendez of the University of Texas Baseball. Although it can be given to any amateur player, the award has always been given to a college baseball player.

Winners

See also

List of college baseball awards

Notes

References
GeneralSpecific

College baseball trophies and awards in the United States
 
College baseball player of the year awards in the United States
Sportsmanship trophies and awards
Awards established in 1978
1978 establishments in the United States